Neheng Khatala (born 2 July 1992) is a Lesotho long-distance runner. She qualified to represent Lesotho at the 2020 Summer Olympics in Tokyo 2021, competing in women's marathon.

References

 

1992 births
Living people
Lesotho female long-distance runners
Athletes (track and field) at the 2020 Summer Olympics
Olympic athletes of Lesotho
Athletes (track and field) at the 2022 Commonwealth Games